Dwayne Domonick Grant (born November 4, 1987), known as D-Teck, is an American hip hop recording artist, record producer, songwriter, rapper, and label owner.  He was born in Kingston, Jamaica and was raised in the Bronx, New York. He has worked with and produced the likes of Common Kings, Akon, Cara Braia, IamStylezMusic, Richie Loop, JQT, DJ Pain 1 and most recently serves as CEO of Wazzup Media Group.

Musical career

2001–2010: Early career
In 2001, D-TECK  began writing, singing, and rapping in part by his love of hip-hop. In 2004,  D-Teck was introduce to  Christopher "Spida" Boswell, former member of the Refugee Camp and currently of Konvict Yard Muzik. Christopher "Spida" Boswell was the one who gave Dwayne the name "D-Teck".  In 2010, Qwes Kross,  elevated D-TECK as an official member of the 50/50 Konvict Muzik. Today, D-Teck serves as online marketing director, A&R and recording artist.

2010–2014: Konvict Muzik
In early 2012, D-teck was promoted as A&R Director for Konvict Muzik Group by the Co-CEO and Founder Melvin E. Brown.  As A&R Director, D-Teck presented Common Kings to both Melvin E. Brown and Co-founder of Konvict Muzik Group Megastar Akon.  Common Kings were subsequently signed to Sony Music division in Australia.  D-Teck was also instrumental in discovering K-pop Girls group JQT. As a result, JQT was also signed to Konvict Muzik. Currently, D-Teck is the Director of Artist & Repertoire, Talent Scouting, and Music Production.

2015–present: Wazzup Media Group
In 2015, Dwayne "D-Teck" Grant created Wazzup Media Group under which he serves as CEO .  D-Teck realized the need for a platform that covers entertainment in a broad sense without media bias; therefore, launching the conglomerate. D-Teck expertise and connections in the industry pivots as the engine behind Wazzup Media Group which expands radio, internet marketing, advertising, and a recording label. On November 7, 2016, Wazzup Media Group launched the company to the public with a gala that included performances by Ted Park, Muscle Team Fuzz, and perishable items for charity provided by celebrity chef, Shawnae Dixon.

Discography

Music/Production/Mixtapes
 2010:  A-Wax feat. D-Teck -If I'm Arrested
 2011:  JDIAMONDZ feat. D-TECK -MURDERER 
 2012:  D-Teck feat. Rassel -Your Love
 2013:  Akon feat D-Teck -One Time
 2013: I'm So Necessary Rashaun Will (Executive Produced)
 2012:  D-Teck feat. Choclair and Koncreto - We Run It Now
 2018: IamStylezMusic -Who God Bless

References

Further reading 
 One Rpm, "Artist", One Rpm, 2015 
 SoundCloud, "D-Teck, Common Kings", Melvin Brown Interview, 2012
 ITunes, "Itunes Profile", Itunes profile, 2015
 HipHopVibe, "50Cent and Drake Collaboration", Hip-Hop Vibe, 2014
 Times of India, "RaOol's new track 'Dhuwan'", India Times, 2013
 ThisIs50, "D-Teck signs Uganda Producer", ThisIs50, 2013
 Madison Hip-hop Awards, "D-Teck Awards Committee", Madison HipHop Awards, 2013
 ChartSong, "A-Wax feat. D-Teck", If I'm Arrested, 2013

External links 
 

1987 births
Living people